The Gürgaletsch is a mountain of the Plessur Alps, located between Churwalden and Tschiertschen in the Swiss canton of Graubünden.

References

External links
 Gürgaletsch on Hikr

Mountains of the Alps
Mountains of Switzerland
Mountains of Graubünden
Two-thousanders of Switzerland
Arosa